Israel Shumacher  (or Schumacher, 1908 – May 21, 1961) was a Jewish comedian who worked together with Shimon Dzigan, thus forming "Dzigan and Shumacher", one of the most famous Yiddish comic duos in the 20th century.

Biography
Israel Shumacher first met Shimon Dzigan at the Yiddish  experimental kleynkunst  (cabaret) stage of the theater Ararat in Łódź, Poland.

During Second World War, the duo went through forced labor in the Gulag, escaped from the Soviet Union and fled from Europe to Israel. The duo played themselves at Poland's Yiddish language feature made in 1948 called "Unzere kinder", the first feature film about the Holocaust in Poland ever made where they played themselves. They also had a TV show that ran during the 1970s. For example, to explain Einstein theory of relativity with their own brand of humor, one would explain to the other « If you have seven hairs in your soup, it's a lot. If you have seven hairs on your head, it's very little. That's relativity ».

The duo's TV and live performance was Yiddish satire that focused on their experience in the Gulag, fleeing Europe, and their experience as new immigrants to Israel.

Shows
On the Ship to Eretz Yisrael

References 

  Dzigan & Shumacher (Israel - Poland / 2009), with photograph at PennyLane Productions, 2009
  The National Centre for Jewish Film, "Our Children" (Unzere Kinder), Poland, 1948

1908 births
1961 deaths
Yiddish theatre performers
Yiddish comedians
Jewish Polish comedians
Yiddish-language satirists
Polish comedians